Khargushi may refer to:
 Khargushi, Hormozgan
 Khargushi, Razavi Khorasan
 Khargushi, Yazd